General elections were held in Gibraltar on 8 November 1950. The Association for the Advancement of Civil Rights emerged as the largest party in the new legislature, winning three of the five elected seats.

Electoral system
The legislature was formed in 1950 to replace Gibraltar City Council, and was elected by single transferable vote.

Results

By candidate

References

General elections in Gibraltar
Gibraltar
General
Election and referendum articles with incomplete results
November 1950 events in Europe